The 2022–23 season is Alba Fehérvár (known as Arconic-Alba Fehérvár for sponsorship reasons) is the 73rd in existence and the club's 35th consecutive season in the top tier of Hungarian basketball.

Times up to 30 October 2022 and from 26 March 2023 are CEST (UTC+2). Times from 30 October 2022 to 26 March 2023 are CET (UTC+1).

Players

Transactions

In

|}

Out

|}

Out on loan

|}

Competitions

Overview

Nemzeti Bajnokság I/A

Results summary

Results by round

Matches

Results overview

References

External links
 Arconic-Alba Fehérvár official website

Alba Fehérvár seasons
Alba Fehérvár